The Asaka (朝香) ōke (princely house) was the eighth oldest branch of the Japanese Imperial Family created from branches of the Fushimi-no-miya house.

Asaka-no-miya 
The Asaka-no-miya house was formed by Prince Yasuhiko, eighth son of Prince Kuni Asahiko. He received the house from the Meiji Emperor in 1906. Injured in an automobile accident in France in 1923, the prince remained in the country while recuperating, learning much about French culture. The princess came to France to nurse him and learned much about Art Deco at a 1925 exposition.

Upon returning to Japan, the prince took on leadership positions in the Shanghai Expeditionary Army and Imperial Guard, becoming an army general. During the closing years of the Pacific War he prepared the Army and Navy for a joint mainland endgame.

Prince Yasuhiko joined the mass resignation from the imperial household in 1947, and took up golf. He died in 1981; his summer estate is now a hotel.

Asaka Takahiko

Prince Takahiko was the eldest son of Asaka Yasuhiko. He was a lieutenant colonel at the end of the second world war. In 1947 he abandoned his Imperial status and took on the name Asaka Takahiko.

References